Doidge is an English surname.

Notable people
Notable people with this surname include:
 Christian Doidge, Welsh footballer
 Ethel Doidge (1887–1965), South African mycologist
 Frederick Doidge, New Zealand journalist and politician
 Geoff Doidge, South African politician
 Matthew Doidge, English cricketer
 Norman Doidge, Canadian psychiatrist